This is a demography of the population of the British Virgin Islands including population density, ethnicity, education level, health of the populace, economic status, religious affiliations and various other aspects.

Population
A July 2009 estimate placed the population of the British Virgin Islands at 24,491. In 2003, 21.9% of the population was under 15 (male 2,401; female 2,358), 73.1% between 15 and 64 (male 8,181; female 7,709), and 5% over 64 (male 578; female 503). 40% of the total population lived in urban areas, with an estimated 1.7% annual rate of urbanization. In 2014, the average woman produced 1.25 children.

Vital statistics

Health
In 2009, the infant mortality rate in the British Virgin Islands was 14.65/1000 births (16.61/1000 for females and 12.58/1000 for males). Life expectancy at birth was 77.26 years: 76.03 years for males and 78.55 years for females.

Education
The official language of the British Virgin Islands is English. In 1991, 97.8% of people aged 15 and over could read and write. Education expenditures represented 3.7% of total GDP in 2006.

Ethnicity

Religion

References

 
Society of the British Virgin Islands